{{Infobox film
| name           = Journey 2: The Mysterious Island
| image          = Journey 2 Poster.jpg
| caption        = Theatrical release poster
| director       = Brad Peyton
| producer       = Beau FlynnTripp VinsonCharlotte Huggins
| writer         = 
| screenplay     = Brian GunnMark Gunn
| based_on       = 
| story          = Richard OuttenBrian GunnMark Gunn
| music          = Andrew Lockington
| starring       = 
| cinematography = David Tattersall
| editing        = David Rennie
| studio         = New Line CinemaWalden MediaContrafilm
| distributor    = Warner Bros. Pictures
| released       = 
| country        = United States
| language       = English
| runtime        = 94 minutes<ref>{{cite web |title=JOURNEY 2 – (PG) |url=https://www.bbfc.co.uk/BFF284382/ |work=British Board of Film Classification |access-date=January 6, 2021 }}</ref>
| budget         = $80 million
| gross          = $335 million
}}Journey 2: The Mysterious Island is a 2012 American science fantasy action-adventure film directed by Brad Peyton and produced by Beau Flynn, Tripp Vinson and Charlotte Huggins. A sequel to Journey to the Center of the Earth (2008), the film is based on Jules Verne's The Mysterious Island (1875). It stars Dwayne Johnson, Michael Caine, Josh Hutcherson, Vanessa Hudgens, Luis Guzmán, and Kristin Davis. The storyline was written by Richard Outten, Brian Gunn and Mark Gunn, and the screenplay by Brian and Mark Gunn.Journey 2: The Mysterious Island was released in cinemas on February 10, 2012, by Warner Bros. Pictures, New Line Cinema and Walden Media to mixed reviews, but was a box office success with a worldwide gross of $335 million, surpassing its predecessor. It was released on DVD/Blu-ray on June 5, 2012.

Plot
Four years after his adventure in the center of the earth, 17-year-old Sean Anderson is arrested by the police for breaking into a satellite control center in hopes of enhancing a coded signal that could have been sent by his long-missing grandfather, Alexander Anderson. Wanting to bond with Sean, his new stepfather Hank Parsons helps decipher the code, which leads to three books: Treasure Island, Gulliver's Travels, and Jules Verne's Mysterious Island. Using the books' individual maps, Hank uses a backlight to make them a single island, complete with the coordinates to its location. Hoping to prove to Sean that there is no mysterious island there, Hank agrees to take him to where the coordinates point to.

In Palau, Hank reluctantly hires helicopter tourism guide Gabato and his daughter Kailani (on whom Sean develops an immediate crush) to fly to the coordinates, as they are the only ones willing to take them. The helicopter gets caught in a cyclone and they crash into the Pacific, waking up on the island.

Moving inland, they are shocked to discover miniature elephants (which belong to a prehistoric species, the Dwarf sicilian elephant) and giant butterflies. After coming across an egg clutch, Gabato accidentally wakes up a giant frilled lizard, which chases them throughout the jungle. They nearly get eaten, but are saved by Alexander. He takes them to a hut he built from the wreckage of the ship that brought him to the island. He has a working radio, but due to the positioning of the satellite, it will be two weeks before they can call out.

The next morning, Alexander leads the group to the lost city of Atlantis, which rises every 70 years and sinks again after a couple of days. Their only means of salvation seems to be the legendary Nautilus, Captain Nemo's submarine. Kailani enters Nemo's crypt and finds his journal, which shows that Nautilus is in a cave at Poseidon's Cliffs.

To go there, they mount giant bees and fly over a high ridge. When giant bee-eater birds try to devour them, Sean saves Kailani's life, but dislocates his ankle. Hank and Alexander reset Sean's ankle, then the group has a bonding moment when Hank sings his rendition of "What a Wonderful World" to ease Sean's pain.

The next morning, the water rises greatly and Hank deduces that the island will sink in a matter of hours. Gabato is missing, having gone toward the island's volcano in search of gold. While Alexander and Kailani go after him, Sean and Hank head for Poseidon's Cliffs.

To reach Nautilus underwater cave, Sean and Hank create makeshift oxygen tanks and dive down fifty feet, but are nearly killed by a giant electric moray eel. The 140-year-old batteries have run down, so they engineer a way to start the submarine with the eel's electricity.

Kailani and Alexander find Gabato and convince him to escape with them instead of trying for the volcano. As they near Poseidon's Cliffs, the volcano erupts. Sean and Hank arrive in Nautilus just in time to rescue the others from the water. Gabato pilots the submarine out of harm's way while Hank and Sean fire torpedoes into the path of falling debris. As they clear the dangers, Kailani kisses Sean for his bravery.

Six months later, Kailani and Gabato are well off, as he runs the most popular tourist attraction on Palautours aboard the Nautilus. Kailani visits Sean on his birthday. While the family celebrates, Alexander arrives with a book for Sean's birthday presentJules Verne's From the Earth to the Moon, Alexander's suggestion for the next new adventure with the family.

The film ends with the camera panning to the moon.

Cast

 Dwayne Johnson as Hank, Sean's stepfather and a former Navy code breaker.
 Michael Caine as Alexander, Sean's grandfather who is the father of Max and Trevor Anderson from the previous film.
 Josh Hutcherson as Sean, Hank's stepson who wants to find his missing grandfather on the Mysterious Island.
 Luis Guzmán as Gabato, Kailani's father, who is part of the father-daughter tour guide team.
 Vanessa Hudgens as Kailani, part of the father-daughter tour guide company and Sean's love interest.
 Kristin Davis as Liz, Sean's mother and Hank's wife. Portrayed by Jane Wheeler in the previous film.
 Anna Colwell as Jessica
 Stephen Caudill as Cop, a police officer who is a friend of Hank's.
 Branscombe Richmond as Tour Guide
 Walter Bankson as Hockey Player

Production

After the commercial success of the first film, New Line Cinema and Walden Media purchased Richard Outten's spec script, Mysterious Travels, in March 2009 to serve as the basis for the film. In the story, the characters embark on a journey to a mysterious uncharted island thought to have inspired the writing of three literary classics: Robert Louis Stevenson's Treasure Island, Jonathan Swift's Gulliver's Travels, and Jules Verne's Mysterious Island. Brian Gunn and Mark Gunn were chosen to revise Outten's script. Warner Bros. and New Line Cinema announced that Journey 2: The Mysterious Island would be released on February 10, 2012.

Casting
Josh Hutcherson was the only actor to reprise his role. Due to scheduling issues, Brendan Fraser and Anita Briem did not return. Kristin Davis replaced Jane Wheeler as Sean's mother Liz. Dwayne Johnson played Sean's stepfather, who is forced to accompany Sean on the trip to find his missing grandfather Alexander (played by Michael Caine) on a mythical and monstrous island. Vanessa Hudgens was cast as Hutcherson's love interest, Kailani.

Short film
The theatrical release of the film was preceded by a Looney Tunes short film titled Daffy's Rhapsody, featuring Daffy Duck and Elmer Fudd in the first CG or 3-D depiction of these specific Looney Tunes characters. The short film's director, Matthew O'Callaghan, noted that "Daffy Rhapsody was originally recorded in the early 1950s as part of a kids' album". Unlike the earlier CG Looney Tunes shorts that appeared before Happy Feet Two and Yogi Bear, this short did not appear on the home video release of the film it accompanied.

Release

Theatrical releaseJourney 2: The Mysterious Island was released in cinemas on February 10, 2012, by Warner Bros. Pictures, Walden Media and New Line Cinema. The film was accompanied by a 3D Looney Tunes short titled Daffy's Rhapsody. The short was originally going to play before Happy Feet Two, but was replaced with I Tawt I Taw a Puddy Tat to go along with the bird theme.

Home mediaJourney 2: The Mysterious Island was released on DVD/Blu-ray on June 5, 2012.

Reception
Box officeJourney 2: The Mysterious Island grossed $103.9 million in North America and $231.4 million in other territories, for a worldwide total of $335.3 million, against a production budget of $79 million surpassing its predecessor. In North America, the film earned a $6.54 million on its debut Friday, ranking fourth at the box office. Over the weekend, it earned $27.3 million, coming in third place, much higher than the original's $21.0 million debut. Outside North America, Journey 2 began its run three weeks before its North American release. It topped the box office outside North America for two consecutive weekends and three in total. It surpassed the original's total outside North America. Its highest-grossing region after North America was China ($58.4 million), followed by Russia and the CIS ($17.6 million) and Mexico ($12.7 million).

Critical response
On Rotten Tomatoes the film has an approval rating of 44% based on 131 reviews with an average rating of 4.92/10. The site's critical consensus reads: "Aggressively unambitious, Journey 2 might thrill teen viewers, but most others will find it too intense for young audiences and too cartoonishly dull for adults". On Metacritic, the film has a score of 41 out of 100 based on reviews from 27 critics, indicating "mixed or average reviews". Audiences polled by CinemaScore gave the film an average grade of "A−" on an A+ to F scale.

Lisa Schwarzbaum of Entertainment Weekly gave the film a B grade, stating that "the movie flies by pleasantly, and is then instantly forgettable. Perhaps Jules Verne can explain the science of that". Randy Cordova from the Arizona Republic said: "Johnson can't save the movie, directed by Brad Peyton, from being a sloppy skip from one seemingly unrelated idea to the next". Roger Ebert, who gave the first film two stars, gave the sequel two-and-a-half stars, stating: "It isn't a "good" movie in the usual sense (or most senses), but it is jolly and goodnatured, and Michael Caine and Dwayne Johnson are among the most likable of actors".

Accolades

Soundtrack
 Letterbomb - Performed by Green Day
 Sleep Forever - Performed by Crocodiles
 Aloha Oe - Performed by Dwayne Johnson
 Hello Again - Performed by Meta & The Cornerstones
 Three Little Birds - Performed by Bob Marley & The Wailers
 What a Wonderful World - Performed by Dwayne Johnson

Future
In August 2014, Carey Hayes and Chad Hayes were announced to write the script for a third film. Brad Peyton and Dwayne Johnson were expected to direct and star in the sequel, respectively. It was later stated that there would be two sequels. By January 2018 however, Johnson stated despite the financial success of The Mysterious Island, and although a third film titled Journey from the Earth to the Moon was intended, its development had been cancelled due to a lack of immediate interest and troubles in adequately adapting the novel. Despite this, reports from Hollywood production insiders arose in August 2020, stating that a sequel was once again in development. In December 2021, Hiram Garcia confirmed that Warner Bros. Pictures wants a sequel film, though Seven Bucks Productions decided to delay development in favor of pursuing other projects.

See also
 Journey to the Center of the Earth'' (2008 film)

References

External links

 
 
 
 
 
 Journey 2: The Mysterious Island Now Shooting; Set Photos Surface at /Film

2012 films
American 3D films
Films based on The Mysterious Island
Films shot in Hawaii
Films shot in North Carolina
American action adventure films
American fantasy adventure films
Films set in Atlantis
Films set in Palau
Films set on fictional islands
2012 3D films
IMAX films
2010s adventure films
Warner Bros. films
New Line Cinema films
Walden Media films
Science fantasy films
Films directed by Brad Peyton
Films produced by Beau Flynn
Films scored by Andrew Lockington
Giant monster films
2010s English-language films
2010s American films